Lee Mark Hildreth (born 22 November 1988) is an English footballer who plays for Southern League Premier Central side Barwell, where he plays as a midfielder.

Playing career

Coventry City
Hildreth joined Coventry City as an eight-year-old after being scouted playing for Hartshill Sports and the Nuneaton-born midfielder went on to captain the City under 18s. He also scored the winning goal in extra-time for Coventry City reserves in the Senior Cup against Nuneaton Borough. They then went on to lift the trophy in May and he followed that success up by making his first-team debut as a late substitute on the final day of the 2006/07 season against Burnley as a substitute for Jay Tabb. At the end of the season he signed his first professional contract with a one-year deal; however, he did not make another appearance for Coventry and at the end of the 2007–2008 season manager Chris Coleman announced Hildreth would be one of eight first team player whose contracts would not be renewed, and was subsequently released.

Tamworth
Hildreth joined Tamworth in July 2008 but was released by mutual consent on 14 October 2008 after falling out with the management at the club.

Corby Town
Three days after leaving the club, Hildreth joined Corby Town, making his debut the next day in a 2–1 win over Bedford Town in the FA Trophy.

Brackley Town
At the end of the season Hildreth left Corby to sign for Brackley Town. after pre season at Brackley Town Lee joined the Marines in September 2009, taking a 4-year break from football to fight in the War in Afghanistan.

Nuneaton Griff
Hildreth joined Nuneaton Griff in 2012 as his time in the Marines was drawing to an end. He helped Nuneaton Griff go on to the best FA Cup run of the club's history.

Tamworth
Hildreth rejoined Tamworth for the 2013/2014 season and went on to play holding midfield for Tamworth for the season. He helped the Club go on a great run in the FA Cup, beating Cheltenham in the first round with Lee picking up Man-of-the-match, then going on to lose narrowly in the second round to Bristol City.

Rushall Olympic
Hildreth left Tamworth and joined Rushall Olympic on 12 September 2014.

Nuneaton Griff
Hildreth left Rushall Olympic and rejoined Nuneaton Griff at the end of the 2014–15 season, helping Griff stay up.

Sutton Coldfield Town
Lee signed for Sutton Coldfield Town on 20 November 2016.

Barwell
Hildreth moved to Barwell on 9 January 2017.

Nuneaton Borough
On 1 February 2019, Hildreth left Nuneaton Borough.

Barwell
Lee Hildreth again returned to Barwell on 2 March 2019.

Career statistics
Statistics accurate as of match played 22 June 2014.

References

External links

Lee Hildreth player profile at ccfc.co.uk

1988 births
Living people
English footballers
English Football League players
Sportspeople from Nuneaton
Coventry City F.C. players
Tamworth F.C. players
Corby Town F.C. players
Brackley Town F.C. players
Rushall Olympic F.C. players
Nuneaton Griff F.C. players
Sutton Coldfield Town F.C. players
Barwell F.C. players
Nuneaton Borough F.C. players
Association football midfielders